The Memory of Water is a 2015 Chilean drama film written and directed by Matías Bize. It was screened in the Venice Days section at the 72nd Venice International Film Festival. It won the Colón de Oro for best director at the 2015 Festival de Cine Iberoamericano de Huelva.

Plot 
Amanda (played by Elena Anaya) and Javier (played by Benjamín Vicuña) separate after the death of their son. Each of them tries to rebuild their life in their own way: she through grief, and he through escapism. Together, they embark on a journey that could bring them back together as a couple, but they also come to realize that love alone is not enough to overcome the tragedy they have experienced.

Cast 

 Elena Anaya  as Amanda 
 Benjamín Vicuña as Javier 
 Néstor Cantillana as  Marcos 
 Sergio Hernández as Pedro 
 Silvia Marty as Mónica
 Etienne Bobenrieth - Hernán
 Antonia Zegers as Pamela
 Alba Flores as Carmen
 Pablo Cerda as Jonás

References

External links  

2015 drama films
2015 films
Chilean drama films
2010s Chilean films
2010s Spanish-language films